Achaea indeterminata is a species of moth of the family Erebidae first described by Francis Walker in 1865. It is found in South Africa and Eswatini.

References

Achaea (moth)
Moths described in 1865
Erebid moths of Africa